Meilisi Daur District is an outlying district of the city of Qiqihar, Heilongjiang Province, China.

Area: 

Population: 

Post Code: 161021

Administrative divisions 
Meilisi Daur District is divided into 1 subdistrict, 4 towns, 1 ethnic town and 1 ethnic township. 
1 subdistricts
 Meilisi
4 towns
 Ya'ersai, Dahudian, Gonghe, Meilisi
1 ethnic town
 Woniutu Daur
1 ethnic township
 Manggetu Daur

References

External links

Districts of Qiqihar